Korangal Valley (alternatively spelled Korengal, Kurangal, Korangal), also nicknamed "The Valley of Death" is a valley in the Dara-I-Pech District of Kunar Province, eastern Afghanistan.

Agriculture and forestry

The valley is formed by a right tributary of the Pech River. It is about 10 kilometers (6.2 mi) long and 10 kilometers wide . The valley has rocky mountains with limited agricultural land. The Korangal valley is lushly forested with pine trees. Much of the valley's income is due to legal and illegal forestry and timber sales. In 2006, U.S. military and the government of Afghanistan reclaimed the Lumber Yard and established the first government presence in the valley since the 1980s. The Afghan government is working to find ways to boost the economy of the region so that illegal timbering can come to an end.

Population

The Korangalies are Pashai, and their native language is Northeastern Pashayi but many are fluent in Pashto because the Safi tribe, a Pashtun tribe, live around them and they have some integration with this tribe.

Villages
The valley includes more than a dozen villages:

War in Afghanistan

U.S. Army Special Forces and Rangers had conducted an unknown number of operations there prior to October 2004 when 3rd Battalion, 6th Marines became the first Marine unit to begin operations there, followed by 3rd Battalion, 3rd Marines the next month. In the fall of 2005, the Marines of 2nd Battalion, 3rd Marines Echo Company conducted a 28-day foot patrol beginning at the backside of the valley, not only making them the farthest occupying force in that area to date but also claiming the longest completed foot patrol since Vietnam. Later Ed Darack wrote the book Victory Point, documenting two operations that the 2nd Battalion, 3rd Marines conducted in the area, including the Korangal Valley, Operation Red Wings, and Operation Whalers.

The Korangal Outpost (KOP) was established at an abandoned lumber yard in April 2006 by Task Force Lava of 1st Battalion, 3rd Marines and subsequently transferred to the U.S. Army's Alpha Company, 1st Battalion, 32nd Infantry, 10th Mountain Division. Firebase Phoenix (later called Firebase Vimoto) was established in the village of Babeyal in the spring of 2007 by 2nd Platoon, A Company, 1st Battalion, 32nd Infantry, 10th Mountain Division to act as a security buffer between the villagers and active anti-coalition militia (ACM) fighters in the valley.

The strongly independent tribes of the Korangal Valley, who have opposed all forms of government other than a council of elders, viewed the U.S. troops as invaders. This created constant tension between the locals and the U.S. military which prevented significant progress against the Taliban. And so, after years of sustained fighting and casualties, the U.S. military closed Korangal Outpost on April 14, 2010, after which the valley reverted to Taliban control.  Forty-two American service men died fighting in the Korangal and hundreds were wounded, primarily between 2006 and 2009. Many Afghan soldiers died there as well. The valley has been dubbed "The Valley of Death" by American forces.

British photographer Tim Hetherington won the World Press Photo award for 2008 with a shot he took while reporting on the war in Korangal Valley for Vanity Fair magazine in January 2008. Sebastian Junger's (2010) book War, and the subsequent film Restrepo, document his experiences while embedded with Battle Company, 2nd Battalion, 503rd Infantry, 173rd Airborne Brigade Combat Team manning the small Outpost Restrepo, named for fallen medic Juan Sebastián Restrepo, in the Korangal Valley. A second film, Korengal, gives a more in depth view into life at Outpost Restrepo.

By early 2019, the valley was captured by Islamic State - Khorasan Province affiliated groups, after multiple clashes with Taliban groups present in the area. Clashes are still ongoing between Taliban-affiliated groups and ISKP fighters in the valley.

See also
 Restrepo, 2010 documentary
 Korengal, 2014 documentary
 Valleys of Afghanistan
 Operation Rock Avalanche

References

Bibliography

External links

 

Valleys of Afghanistan
Landforms of Kunar Province